A secret agent is a covert agent engaged in espionage.

The Secret Agent or Secret Agents may also refer to:

Books
The Secret Agent, a 1907 novel by Joseph Conrad

Films and television

Based on the Conrad novel
 The Secret Agent (1992 TV series), with Peter Capaldi and David Suchet
 The Secret Agent (1996 film), with Bob Hoskins
 The Secret Agent (2016 TV series), with Toby Jones

Unrelated to Conrad novel
 The Secret Agent (1924 film), a German silent film
Secret Agent (1932 film), a German thriller film
 Secret Agent (1936 film), directed by Alfred Hitchcock based on stories by W. Somerset Maugham
Hitchcock filmed Conrad's The Secret Agent as Sabotage
 Secret Agent (1943 film), the last of Paramount's "Superman" cartoon shorts
 Secret Agent (1947 film), a Soviet film by Boris Barnet
 Danger Man, a 1960s British TV series titled Secret Agent for U.S. broadcasts
 The Secret Agent (documentary), a 2004 BBC documentary about the British National Party

Music
 Secret Agent (Chick Corea album), 1978
 Secret Agent (Robin Gibb album), 1984
 Secret Agent (Judie Tzuke album), 1998
 "The Secret Agent", a song from the album Electric Tepee by Hawkwind, 1992
 Secret Agent, a radio channel on SomaFM

Videogames
 Secret Agent (video game), a 1992 computer game by Apogee Software, rereleased 2013
 Sly Spy, a 1989 arcade game, known in Japan as Secret Agent in Europe as Sly Spy: Secret Agent

See also
 Secret Agent Man (disambiguation)
 Special Agent, in the United States Secret Service